Lorin Crawford is the RGSS Assistant Professor of Biostatistics at Brown University. He is affiliated with the Center for Statistical Sciences, Center for Computational Molecular Biology, and the Robert J. and Nancy D. Carney Institute for Brain Science. His scientific research interests involve the development of novel and efficient computational methodologies to address complex problems in statistical genetics, cancer pharmacology, and radiomics (e.g. cancer imaging).

Professional career 
Crawford received his PhD from the Department of Statistical Science at Duke University in 2017. He received his Bachelors of Science degree in Mathematics at Clark Atlanta University in 2013.

Awards and honors 
 2019: Named one of Forbes' 30 Under 30 
 2019: The Root 100 Most Influential African Americans  
 2019: Alfred P. Sloan Research Fellowship  
 2020: Honoree for Mathematically Gifted and Black. 
 2020: Packard Fellowship in Science and Engineering.

References 

Biostatisticians
Living people
Brown University faculty
Duke University Trinity College of Arts and Sciences alumni
Clark Atlanta University alumni
Year of birth missing (living people)